A by-election was held for the New South Wales Legislative Assembly electorate of Inverell on 31 May 1902 because of the death of William McIntyre.

Dates

Result

William McIntyre died.

See also
Electoral results for the district of Inverell
List of New South Wales state by-elections

Notes

References

1902 elections in Australia
New South Wales state by-elections
1900s in New South Wales